Osborne Samuel Parks (10 October 1914 – 2 October 1992) was an Australian rules footballer who played with North Melbourne in the Victorian Football League (VFL).

Notes

External links 

1914 births
1992 deaths
Australian rules footballers from Victoria (Australia)
North Melbourne Football Club players
Yarraville Football Club players